Dammasch State Hospital was a mental hospital, asylum, and educational center located in Wilsonville, Oregon, United States. Named for Dr. Ferdinand H. Dammasch, the hospital opened in 1961 and closed in 1995. After its closure, the former site was embroiled in local controversy as it was a proposed location for a women's prison, which angered local residents as the site is less than a mile from residential neighborhoods. The Dammasch building was demolished, and the Villebois housing development occupies its former site.

See also
 Callahan Center (later Living Enrichment Center) was contiguous to the hospital site and part of the larger development planning area.

References

External links

 Smith Eliot's images of Dammasch State Hospital
 Slide show of Dammasch pictures from the Oregon State Archives
 A Dammasch State Hospital tribute website with a collection of images, videos and stories
 John Kloepper's images of Dammasch State Hospital

Hospital buildings completed in 1961
Psychiatric hospitals in Oregon
Defunct hospitals in Oregon
Buildings and structures in Wilsonville, Oregon
Hospitals established in 1961
Demolished buildings and structures in Oregon
1961 establishments in Oregon
1995 disestablishments in Oregon
Hospitals disestablished in 1995